Denton Historic District is a national historic district in Denton, Caroline County, Maryland, United States. It is located on the flat land along the south bank of the Choptank River.  The west end of the district focuses on the courthouse square, which was laid out in the 1790s, with its late 19th century courthouse building and square faced on all sides by noteworthy residences and commercial structures.  The historic commercial district extends east of the square along Market Street.  It comprises a notable collection of two-story brick storefronts and one-story concrete block commercial structures, with frame residences representing late-19th / early-20th century forms interspersed among them.

It was added to the National Register of Historic Places in 1983.

References

External links
, including photo dated 1983, at Maryland Historical Trust
Boundary Map of the Denton Historic District, Caroline County, at Maryland Historical Trust

Denton, Maryland
Historic districts in Caroline County, Maryland
Historic districts on the National Register of Historic Places in Maryland
Queen Anne architecture in Maryland
Colonial Revival architecture in Maryland
National Register of Historic Places in Caroline County, Maryland